New Hope Farm, also known as New Hope Post Office and Snoddy Farm, is a historic farm complex located at Wellford, Spartanburg County, South Carolina.  The main house was built in 1885, and is a one-story farmhouse with Folk Victorian decorative elements. It features a steeply-pitched pressed metal-shingled roof, weatherboard siding, and a wraparound hip-roofed porch. Also on the property is a complex of domestic and agricultural outbuildings dating from about 1885 to 1905. They include a small two-story frame servant's house, a smokehouse, a privy, a corn crib, a buggy barn and a garage.

It was listed on the National Register of Historic Places in 1999.

References

Farms on the National Register of Historic Places in South Carolina
Victorian architecture in South Carolina
Houses completed in 1885
Houses in Spartanburg County, South Carolina
National Register of Historic Places in Spartanburg County, South Carolina